The 2010 Barnet Council election took place on 6 May 2010 to elect members of Barnet London Borough Council in London, England. The whole council was up for election and the Conservative party stayed in overall control of the council.

Background
Before the election the Conservatives ran the council with 36 seats, compared to 20 for Labour and 6 for the Liberal Democrats, with one seat vacant in Golders Green ward. A total of 251 candidates stood in the election including a full slate of 63 each from the Conservative, Labour and Liberal Democrat parties. The Green party stood 51 candidates, a record for the party in Barnet, while there were 11 candidates from the new Residents Association of Barnet, 1 from the British National Party and 2 independents.

The Conservative councillors Mike Freer and Matthew Offord stood down at the election, as they were standing in the constituencies of Finchley and Golders Green and Hendon respectively in the general election, which took place at the same as the council election.

Election result
The results saw the Conservatives increase their majority on the council after making a net gain of 2 seats to have 39 councillors. The Conservatives lost 1 seat to Labour in Coppetts ward, but gained 3 seats from the Liberal Democrats. This left Labour on 21 seats, while the Liberal Democrats were reduced to 3 seats in Childs Hill, after losing 2 seats in Mill Hill and 1 seat in High Barnet to the Conservatives. Neither the Green party nor the Residents' Association of Barnet managed to win any seats.

Election result
The results saw the Conservatives increase their majority on the council after making a net gain of 2 seats to have 39 councillors. The Conservatives lost 1 seat to Labour in Coppetts ward, but gained 3 seats from the Liberal Democrats. This left Labour on 21 seats, while the Liberal Democrats were reduced to 3 seats in Childs Hill, after losing 2 seats in Mill Hill and 1 seat in High Barnet to the Conservatives. Neither the Green party nor the Residents' Association of Barnet managed to win any seats.

|}

Ward results

Brunswick Park

Burnt Oak

Childs Hill

Colindale

Coppetts

East Barnet

East Finchley

Edgware

Finchley Church End

Garden Suburb

Golders Green

Hale

Hendon

High Barnet

Mill Hill

Oakleigh

Totteridge

Underhill

West Finchley

West Hendon

Woodhouse

By-elections between 2010 and 2014

East Finchley

The by-election was called following the resignation of Cllr. Andrew McNeil on 22 February. At the previous election, the Green Party candidate had polled 8.5% of votes cast.

Brunswick Park

The by-election was called following the death of Cllr. Lynne Hillan on 5 April.

References

2010
2010 London Borough council elections
May 2010 events in the United Kingdom